Lê Văn Thành is a Vietnamese politician who is serving as Deputy Prime Minister of Vietnam from 8 April 2021.

Personal life 
He was born in October 20, 1962 in Vinh Bao District. In 1997, he joined Communist Party of Vietnam.

References 

Deputy Prime Ministers of Vietnam
Vietnamese politicians
Members of the 12th Central Committee of the Communist Party of Vietnam
Members of the 13th Central Committee of the Communist Party of Vietnam